Vasuki Bhaskar is an Indian fashion and costume designer, working in the Tamil film industry. She is the daughter of film producer R.D. Bhaskar and Pavalar Creations is their own production house.

Career
Vasuki was born as the only daughter to the late R. D. Bhaskar, film producer and brother of legendary composer Ilaiyaraaja. Her brothers are film director Parthi Bhaskar and playback singer and actor Hari Bhaskar, who briefly worked on an unfinished film titled Oru Idhayam Oru Kaathal in 2004, and Viyugam, opposite Kanchi Kaul. Music directors Karthik Raja, Yuvan Shankar Raja, singer Bhavatharini, film director and actor Venkat Prabhu and comedy actor, singer and composer Premji Amaren are her cousins.

Vasuki was studying in a designing course at Loyola College. Director Bharathiraja offered her the opportunity to design costumes for his film Kangalal Kaidhu Sei, after he saw her designs at some events. She designed the costumes in all of Venkat Prabhu's films and got good reviews. For the upcoming film Mankatha she gave Ajith Kumar a salt and pepper look, which was much spoken about. She designed costumes for Prasanna and Sibi Raj in Naanayam and gave them a makeover. She worked with directors Prabhu Deva in Villu and Bala in Avan Ivan. She also worked for an English movie Anything for You, which was a flop.

Filmography

Films
 Kangalal Kaidhu Sei
 Chennai 600028
 Saroja
 Abhiyum Naanum
 Villu
 Naanayam
 Unnai Saranadainthen
 Paramasivan
 Thamizh Padam
 Goa
 Inidhu Inidhu
 Yuvan Yuvathi
 Mankatha
 Anything for You
 Samar
 Varuthapadatha Valibar Sangam
 Pandiya Naadu
 Endrendrum Punnagai
 Aarambam
 Naan Sigappu Manithan
 Poojai
 Aambala
 Massu Engira Masilamani
 Paayum Puli
 Sulthan
 Chennai 600028 II: Second Innings
 Sathuranga Vettai 2
 Rendavathu Padam
 Madha Gaja Raja
' 'Maanaadu' '

Commercials
 Vummidi Bangaru Jewellers
 Prince Jewellery
 Pothys
 Nalli (wardrobe store)
 Sree Kumaran Thangamaligai
 Nathella Jewellery
 12345

Television shows
 Vijay TV - Jodi Number One Season 1 to 3
 Vijay TV - Boys vs Girls

References

External links
 
 Vasuki Bhaskar about Friendship day!!

Indian costume designers
Living people
Fashion stylists
21st-century Indian designers
21st-century Indian women artists
Indian women fashion designers
Women artists from Tamil Nadu
Artists from Chennai
Year of birth missing (living people)